Yazoo Clay is a clay geologic formation in Alabama, Louisiana, and Mississippi. It was named after a bluff along the Yazoo River at Yazoo City, Mississippi It contains is a type of clay known as montmorillonite, making it a poor foundation material due to the fact that moisture causes extreme changes in volume. Sand, pyrite, and marl have all been noted in the formation. It preserves fossils from the Eocene, including the prehistoric cetacean Basilosaurus.

See also
 List of fossiliferous stratigraphic units in Alabama
 List of fossiliferous stratigraphic units in Mississippi
 Paleontology in Alabama
 Paleontology in Mississippi

References

 
 

Geologic formations of Alabama
Paleogene Louisiana
Paleogene Mississippi